Tazia Akhter (born 12 December 1993) is a Bangladeshi former cricketer who played as an all-rounder. She appeared in four One Day Internationals and four Twenty20 Internationals for Bangladesh in 2012 and 2013. She played domestic cricket for Khulna Division.

Early life and background
Akhter was born on 12 December 1993 in Bangladesh.

Career

ODI career
Akhter made her ODI debut against the South Africa on 6 September 2012.

T20I career
Akhter made her T20I debut against South Africa on 11 September 2012.

Asian Games
Akhter was a member of the team that won a silver medal in cricket against the China national women's cricket team at the 2010 Asian Games in Guangzhou, China.

References

External links
 
 

1993 births
Living people
Bangladeshi women cricketers
Bangladesh women One Day International cricketers
Bangladesh women Twenty20 International cricketers
Cricketers at the 2010 Asian Games
Medalists at the 2010 Asian Games
Asian Games medalists in cricket
Asian Games silver medalists for Bangladesh
Khulna Division women cricketers